TOI-1452 b is a confirmed super-Earth exoplanet, possibly a water world, orbiting a red-dwarf star TOI-1452, in the star's habitable zone, about 100 light-years away in the Draco constellation. The exoplanet is about 70% larger in diameter than Earth, and roughly five times as massive.

Discovery
TOI-1452 b was discovered by an international team led by astronomers from the Université de Montréal, using data from NASA’s Transiting Exoplanet Survey Satellite (TESS). The discovery was first reported in June 2022.

References 

Draco (constellation)
Exoplanets discovered in 2022
Super-Earths
Transiting exoplanets
Exoplanets discovered by TESS